Hubbard Lake is a lake in Alcona County in Northern Michigan. The lake covers 8,850 acres (36 km²)  and is seven miles (11 km) long (north-south) and two miles (3 km) wide. It has a maximum depth of 85 feet (26 m) with an average depth of 32.6 feet (9.9 m). The lake spans three townships: Caledonia, Alcona, and Hawes.

The lake is part of the a large tract of land (more than six million acres (24,000 km²)) that was ceded by the Ojibwa, Ottawa and Potawatomi to the United States in the 1819 Treaty of Saginaw. Permanent white settlers did not begin to arrive in the area until the 1830s and 1840s. At that time, the lake was known as the "Bottomless Lake". It was also for a while known as "Coral Lake" and "Alcona Lake". In 1867, it was named "Hubbard Lake" in honor of Dr. Bela Hubbard, who was a prominent geologist in the state of Michigan.

There are many cottage homes around the lake shore. The lake is a favorite vacation spot for many Michiganders.

The lake is well stocked with bass, yellow perch, northern pike, tiger muskie, trout and walleye and is a popular destination for summer angling as well as winter ice fishing. Although it is not an incorporated municipality, for statistical purposes, the U.S. Census Bureau defines the area immediately surrounding the lake as a census-designated place named Hubbard Lake. There is also a separate, small unincorporated community named Hubbard Lake located about one mile (1.6 km) north of the lake in Ossineke Township in neighboring Alpena County.

See also
List of lakes in Michigan

References

External links

 
Hubbard Lake, Michigan Department of Natural Resources, Status of the Fishery Resource Report, No. 2003-1, 2003, by Tim A. Cwalinski, Surveyed May and September 1996

Bodies of water of Alcona County, Michigan
Lakes of Michigan
Reservoirs in Michigan